Pano Bixhili was an 18th-century General Consul of Russia in Albania and Himara.

Pano Bixhili came from the village Dhërmi, modern Albania, then Ottoman Empire, from an Albanian family background. In 18th century documents from the Russian Imperial Archive of External Affairs, he and his brother Gjika are described as "noble Albanians from Epirus". One of the most notable Albanian families of the Venetian and Ottoman period the Bixhili provided diplomats to the Russian Empire in the 18th century. Moreover, they also provided several officers to the Regimento Cimarioto (Himariote regiment) of the Venetian army as well as for the Albanskoe Volsko and the Odesskii Grecheskii Divizion Russian army.

Being an influential personality, he became the Russian consul in Albania and Himara, in the 1780s. During the Russo-Turkish War (1768-1774) together with Loudovikos Sotiris from Lefkada, became the revolutionary leaders of an uprising in Epirus against the Ottomans. He was probably also a member of the Greek patriotic organization Filiki Eteria.

References

People from Himara
Year of death unknown
Year of birth unknown
18th-century Albanian people